A limner is an illuminator of manuscripts, or more broadly, a graphic artist, especially a portrait painter or an illustrator.

Limner may also refer to:
Lynda Limner
Henry Limner (14th century), MP for Norwich, England
Richard William Murray (1819-1908), English journalist for used "Limner" as his pen-name

See also
 Limneria, a genus of small sea snails
 Painter and Limner, a member of the Royal Household in Scotland